Matthiola fruticulosa, the sad stock or dark-flowered stock, is a species of flowering plant in the family Brassicaceae, native to the Mediterranean region. It is adapted to clay and marl soil types.

References

fruticulosa
Flora of North Africa
Flora of Portugal
Flora of Spain
Flora of the Balearic Islands
Flora of France
Flora of Italy
Flora of Sicily
Flora of Yugoslavia
Flora of Albania
Flora of Greece
Flora of European Turkey
Flora of Turkey
Flora of Cyprus
Flora of Lebanon
Flora of Syria
Plants described in 1932